Ana María Cristina Polo González (born 11 April 1959) is a Cuban-American television arbitrator on Caso Cerrado and Ana Polo Rules.

Born in Havana, Cuba, Ana moved to Puerto Rico when she was 2 years old accompanied by her family. Later, they moved to Miami where she participated in different musicals including Godspell, Jubilee and Show Boat in addition to singing with the chorus of Jubilee, which was invited by Pope Paul VI to sing at St. Peter's Basilica as part of the celebration of the 1975 Holy Year. She is now is the arbitrator on a show called Caso Cerrado, which airs on Telemundo at different times throughout the entire day and she even performed the show’s theme song.

A breast cancer survivor, Polo frequently speaks and raises funds for the cause. She has advocated for LGBT rights throughout her career.

She graduated from the University of Miami School of Law in 1987, and is a member of the Florida Bar. Aside from her work on Caso Cerrado, she was a member of the law firm of Emmanuel Perez & Associates, P.A. in Coral Gables, Florida.

In 2010, Caso Cerrado, which Polo created, was nominated for a Daytime Emmy Award for Outstanding Legal/Courtroom Program. The nomination marked the first time a program from a Spanish-language network had been nominated for an Emmy Award.

References

External links 

American lawyers
American television personalities
American women television personalities
Cuban emigrants to the United States
People from Havana
Living people
1959 births
American women lawyers
Opposition to Fidel Castro
Cuban democracy activists
American LGBT rights activists
Age controversies
American feminists
Cuban feminists